Braunschweig or Brunswick (from Low German ,) is a city in Lower Saxony, Germany, north of the Harz Mountains at the farthest navigable point of the river Oker, which connects it to the North Sea via the rivers Aller and Weser. In 2016, it had a population of 250,704.

A powerful and influential centre of commerce in medieval Germany, Brunswick was a member of the Hanseatic League from the 13th until the 17th century. It was the capital city of three successive states: the Principality of Brunswick-Wolfenbüttel (1269–1432, 1754–1807, and 1813–1814), the Duchy of Brunswick (1814–1918), and the Free State of Brunswick (1918–1946).

Today, Brunswick is the second-largest city in Lower Saxony and a major centre of scientific research and development.

History

Foundation and early history
The date and circumstances of the town's foundation are unknown. Tradition maintains that Brunswick was created through the merger of two settlements, one founded by Brun(o), a Saxon count who died in 880, on one side of the River Oker – the legend gives the year 861 for the foundation – and the other the settlement of a legendary Count Dankward, after whom Dankwarderode Castle ("Dankward's clearing"), which was reconstructed in the 19th century, is named. 

The town's original name of Brunswik is a combination of the name Bruno and Low German wik (related to the Latin vicus), a place where merchants rested and stored their goods. The town's name, therefore, indicates an ideal resting place, as it lay by a ford across the Oker River. Another explanation of the city's name is that it comes from Brand, or burning, indicating a place which developed after the landscape was cleared through burning. The city was first mentioned in documents from the St. Magni Church from 1031, which give the city's name as Brunesguik.

Middle Ages and early modern period

Up to the 12th century, Brunswick was ruled by the Saxon noble family of the Brunonids, then, through marriage, it fell to the House of Welf. In 1142, Henry the Lion of the House of Welf became duke of Saxony and made Braunschweig the capital of his state (which, from 1156 on, also included the Duchy of Bavaria). He turned Dankwarderode Castle, the residence of the counts of Brunswick, into his own Pfalz and developed the city further to represent his authority. Under Henry's rule, the Cathedral of St. Blasius was built and he also had the statue of a lion, his heraldic animal, erected in front of the castle. The lion subsequently became the city's landmark.

Henry the Lion became so powerful that he dared to refuse military aid to the Emperor Frederick I Barbarossa, which led to his banishment in 1182. Henry went into exile in England. He had previously established ties to the English crown in 1168, through his marriage to King Henry II of England's daughter Matilda, sister of Richard the Lionheart. However, his son Otto, who could regain influence and was eventually crowned Holy Roman Emperor, continued to foster the city's development.

During the Middle Ages, Brunswick was an important center of trade, one of the economic and political centers in Northern Europe and a member of the Hanseatic League from the 13th century to the middle of the 17th century. By the year 1600, Brunswick was the seventh largest city in Germany. Although formally one of the residences of the rulers of the Duchy of Brunswick-Lüneburg, a constituent state of the Holy Roman Empire, Brunswick was de facto ruled independently by a powerful class of patricians and the guilds throughout much of the Late Middle Ages and the Early modern period. Because of the growing power of Brunswick's burghers, the Princes of Brunswick-Wolfenbüttel, who ruled over one of the subdivisions of Brunswick-Lüneburg, finally moved their Residenz out of the city and to the nearby town of Wolfenbüttel in 1432. The Princes of Brunswick-Wolfenbüttel didn't regain control over the city until the late 17th century, when Rudolph Augustus, Duke of Brunswick-Lüneburg, took the city by siege. 

In the 18th century Brunswick was not only a political, but also a cultural centre. Influenced by the philosophy of the Enlightenment, dukes like Anthony Ulrich and Charles I became patrons of the arts and sciences. In 1745, Charles I founded the Collegium Carolinum, predecessor of the Brunswick University of Technology, and in 1753 he moved the ducal residence back to Brunswick. With this he attracted poets and thinkers such as Lessing, Leisewitz, and Jakob Mauvillon to his court and the city. Emilia Galotti by Lessing and Goethe's Faust were performed for the first time in Brunswick.

19th century

In 1806, the city was captured by the French during the Napoleonic Wars and became part of the short-lived Napoleonic Kingdom of Westphalia in 1807. The exiled Duke Frederick William raised a volunteer corps, the Black Brunswickers, who fought the French in several battles.

After the Congress of Vienna in 1815, Brunswick was made capital of the re-established independent Duchy of Brunswick, later a constituent state of the German Empire from 1871. In the aftermath of the July Revolution in 1830, in Brunswick duke Charles II was forced to abdicate. His absolutist governing style had previously alienated the nobility and bourgeoisie, while the lower classes were disaffected by the bad economic situation. During the night of 7–8 September 1830, the ducal palace in Brunswick was stormed by an angry mob, set on fire, and destroyed completely. Charles was succeeded by his brother William VIII. During William's reign, liberal reforms were made and Brunswick's parliament was strengthened.

During the 19th century, industrialisation caused a rapid growth of population in the city, eventually causing Brunswick to be for the first time significantly enlarged beyond its medieval fortifications and the River Oker. On 1 December 1838, the first section of the Brunswick–Bad Harzburg railway line connecting Brunswick and Wolfenbüttel opened as the first railway line in Northern Germany, operated by the Duchy of Brunswick State Railway.

Early to mid-20th century

On 8 November 1918, at the end of World War I, a socialist workers' council forced Duke Ernest Augustus to abdicate. On 10 November, the council proclaimed the Socialist Republic of Brunswick under one-party government by the Independent Social Democratic Party of Germany (USPD); however, the subsequent Landtag election on 22 December 1918 was won by the Social Democratic Party of Germany (MSPD), and the USPD and MSPD formed a coalition government. An uprising in Braunschweig in 1919, led by the communist Spartacus League, was defeated when Freikorps troops under Georg Ludwig Rudolf Maercker took over the city on order of the German Minister of Defence, Gustav Noske. An SPD-led government was subsequently established; in December 1921, a new constitution was approved for the Free State of Brunswick, now a parliamentary republic within the Weimar Republic, again with Braunschweig as its capital.

After the Landtag election of 1930, Brunswick became the second state in Germany where the Nazis participated in government, when the National Socialist German Workers' Party (NSDAP) formed a coalition government with several conservative and right-wing parties. With the support of Dietrich Klagges, Brunswick's minister of the interior, the NSDAP organized a large SA rally in Braunschweig. On 17–18 October 1931, 100,000 SA stormtroopers marched through the city; street fights between Nazis, socialists, and communists left several dead or injured. On 25 February 1932, the state of Brunswick granted Adolf Hitler German citizenship to allow him to run in the 1932 German presidential election. In Braunschweig, Nazis carried out several attacks on political enemies, with the acquiescence of the state government.

After the Nazi seizure of power in 1933, several state institutions were placed in Braunschweig, including the Luftfahrtforschungsanstalt in Völkenrode, the Hitler Youth Academy for Youth Leadership, and the SS-Junkerschule Braunschweig. With the Reichswerke Hermann Göring in Salzgitter and the Stadt des KdF-Wagens, as well as several factories in the city itself (including Büssing and the Volkswagenwerk Braunschweig), the Braunschweig region became one of the centres of the German arms industry.

During the Second World War, Braunschweig was a sub-area headquarters of Wehrkreis XI (one of Germany's military districts), and was the garrison city of the 31st Infantry Division that took part in the invasions of Poland, Belgium, and France, largely being destroyed during its retreat following the invasion of Russia. In this period, thousands of Eastern workers were brought to the city as forced labor, and in the 1943–1945 period at least 360 children taken away from such workers died in the Entbindungsheim für Ostarbeiterinnen ("Maternity Ward for Eastern Workers").

In 1944, a subcamp of the concentration camp Neuengamme was established in Braunschweig.  Hundreds of prisoners, mostly Jews, lived in brutal conditions and hundreds died from hunger, disease, and overwork. Piera Sonnino (1922-1999), an Italian author, writes of her imprisonment in that camp in her book, This Has Happened, published in English in 2006 by MacMillan Palgrave.

The Allied air raid on October 15, 1944, destroyed most of the city's churches, and the Altstadt (old town), the largest homogeneous ensemble of half-timbered houses in Germany. 

The city's cathedral, which had been converted to a Nationale Weihestätte (national shrine) by the Nazi government, still stood.

Postwar period to the 21st century
Small sections of the city survived Allied bombing, so remain to represent its distinctive architecture. The cathedral was restored to its function as a Protestant church.

Politically, after the war, the Free State of Brunswick was dissolved by the Allied occupying authorities, Braunschweig ceased to be a capital, and most of its lands were incorporated in the newly formed state of Lower Saxony.

During the Cold War, Braunschweig, then part of West Germany, suffered economically due to its proximity to the Iron Curtain. The city lost its historically strong economic ties to what was then East Germany; for decades, economic growth remained, on average, below the rest of the country while unemployment was above-average for West Germany.

On 28 February 1974, as part of a district reform in Lower Saxony, the rural district of Braunschweig, which had surrounded the city, was disestablished. The major part of the former district was incorporated into the city of Braunschweig, increasing its population by roughly 52,000 people.

In the 1990s, efforts increased to reconstruct historic buildings that had been destroyed in the air raid. The façade of the Braunschweiger Schloss was rebuilt, and buildings such as the Alte Waage (originally built in 1534) now stand again.

Demographics

Population development 
, the population of Braunschweig was 252,768. 

Today, Braunschweig is among the twenty German cities found to be most attractive to young people between the ages of 25 and 34, leading to an influx of younger residents.

Religion
In 2015, 91,785 people or 36.3% of the population were Protestant and 34,604 (13.7%) people were Roman Catholic; 126,379 people (50.0%) either adhered to other denominations or followed no religion.

Immigration
A total of 64,737 of Braunschweig's residents, including German citizens, had an immigrant background in 2015 (25.6% of the total population). Among those, 25,676 were non-German citizens (10.2%); the following table lists up the largest minority groups:

Main sights
The Burgplatz (Castle Square), comprising a group of buildings of great historical and cultural significance: the Cathedral (St Blasius, built at the end of the 12th century); the Burg Dankwarderode (Dankwarderode Castle) (a 19th-century reconstruction of the old castle of Henry the Lion); the Neo-Gothic Town Hall (built in 1893–1900); as well as some picturesque half-timbered houses, such as the Gildehaus (Guild House), today the seat of the Craftsman's Association. In the centre of the square stands a copy of the Burglöwe (Brunswick Lion), a Romanesque statue of a lion, cast in bronze in 1166. The original statue can be seen in the museum of Dankwarderode Castle. The lion remains the symbol of Braunschweig today.
The Altstadtmarkt ("Old Town market"), surrounded by the Old Town town hall (built between the 13th and the 15th centuries in Gothic style), and the Martinikirche (Church of Saint Martin, from 1195), with important historical houses including the Gewandhaus (the former house of the drapers' guild, built sometime before 1268) and the Stechinelli-Haus (built in 1690) and a fountain from 1408.
The Kohlmarkt ("coal market"), a market with many historical houses and a fountain from 1869.
The Hagenmarkt ("Hagen market"), with the 13th-century Katharinenkirche (Church of Saint Catherine) and the Heinrichsbrunnen ("Henry the Lion's Fountain") from 1874.
The Magniviertel (St Magnus' Quarter), a remainder of ancient Braunschweig, lined with cobblestoned streets, little shops and cafés, centred on the 13th-century Magnikirche (St Magnus' Church). Here is also the Rizzi-Haus, a highly distinctive, cartoonish office building designed by architect James Rizzi for the Expo 2000.
The Romanesque and Gothic Andreaskirche (Church of Saint Andrew), built mainly between the 13th and 16th centuries with stained glass by Charles Crodel. Surrounding the church are the Liberei, the oldest surviving freestanding library building in Germany, and the reconstructed Alte Waage.
The Gothic Aegidienkirche (Church of Saint Giles), built in the 13th century, with an adjoining monastery, which is today a museum.
The Staatstheater (State Theatre), newly built in the 19th century, goes back to the first standing public theatre in Germany, founded in 1690 by Duke Anthony Ulrich.
The ducal palace of Braunschweig was bombed in World War II and demolished in 1960. The exterior was rebuilt to contain a palace museum, library and shopping centre, which opened in 2007.
The baroque palace Schloss Richmond ("Richmond Palace"), built between 1768 and 1769 with a surrounding English garden for Princess Augusta of Great Britain, wife of Charles William Ferdinand, Duke of Brunswick-Wolfenbüttel, to remind her of her home in England.
Riddagshausen Abbey (German: Kloster Riddagshausen), a former Cistercian monastery, with the surrounding nature reserve and arboretum. The nature reserve Riddagshäuser Teiche is designated as an Important Bird Area and Special Protection Area.

Parks and gardens
Parks and gardens in the city include the botanical garden Botanischer Garten der Technischen Universität Braunschweig, founded in 1840 by Johann Heinrich Blasius, the Bürgerpark, the Löwenwall with an obelisk from 1825, the Prinz-Albrecht-Park, and the Inselwallpark. Other parks and recreation areas are Stadtpark, Westpark, Theaterpark, Museumpark, Heidbergsee, Südsee, Ölpersee, the zoological garden Arche Noah Zoo Braunschweig and the nearby Essehof Zoo.

Politics

Subdivisions
Braunschweig is made up of 19 boroughs (German: Stadtbezirke), which themselves may consist of several quarters (German: Stadtteile) each. The 19 boroughs, with their official numbers, are:

112: Wabe-Schunter-Beberbach1
113: Hondelage
114: Volkmarode
120: Östliches Ringgebiet
131: Innenstadt
132: Viewegsgarten-Bebelhof
211: Stöckheim-Leiferde
212: Heidberg-Melverode
213: Südstadt-Rautheim-Mascherode
221: Weststadt
222: Timmerlah-Geitelde-Stiddien
223: Broitzem
224: Rüningen
310: Westliches Ringgebiet
321: Lehndorf-Watenbüttel
322: Veltenhof-Rühme
323: Wenden-Thune-Harxbüttel
331: Nordstadt
332: Schunteraue

1Formed in 2011 out of the former boroughs of Wabe-Schunter and Bienrode-Waggum-Bevenrode.

Mayor
The current mayor of Braunschweig is Thorsten Kornblum of the Social Democratic Party (SPD) since 2021. The most recent mayoral election was held on 12 September 2021, with a runoff held on 26 September, and the results were as follows:

! rowspan=2 colspan=2| Candidate
! rowspan=2| Party
! colspan=2| First round
! colspan=2| Second round
|-
! Votes
! %
! Votes
! %
|-
| bgcolor=| 
| align=left| Thorsten Kornblum
| align=left| Social Democratic Party
| 41,734
| 38.4
| 79,861
| 65.9
|-
| bgcolor=| 
| align=left| Kaspar Haller
| align=left| Christian Democratic Union
| 29,011
| 26.7
| 41,401
| 34.1
|-
| bgcolor=| 
| align=left| Tatjana Schneider
| align=left| Alliance 90/The Greens
| 24,802
| 22.8
|-
| bgcolor=| 
| align=left| Mirco Hanker
| align=left| Alternative for Germany
| 4,704
| 4.3
|-
| 
| align=left| Birgit Huvendieck
| align=left| Citizens' Initiative Braunschweig
| 3,215
| 3.0
|-
| bgcolor=| 
| align=left| Anke Schneider
| align=left| The Left
| 2,827
| 2.6
|-
| bgcolor=| 
| align=left| Thomas Hofmann
| align=left| Die PARTEI
| 1,904
| 1.7
|-
| bgcolor=| 
| align=left| Erdmann Gust
| align=left| Independent
| 614
| 0.6
|-
! colspan=3| Valid votes
! 108,811
! 99.3
! 121,262
! 98.1
|-
! colspan=3| Invalid votes
! 721
! 0.7
! 2,407
! 1.9
|-
! colspan=3| Total
! 109,532
! 100.0
! 123,669
! 100.0
|-
! colspan=3| Electorate/voter turnout
! 197,728
! 55.4
! 197,414
! 62.6
|-
| colspan=7| Source: City of Braunschweig
|}

City council

The Braunschweig city council governs the city alongside the Mayor. The most recent city council election was held on 12 September 2021, and the results were as follows:

! colspan=2| Party
! Votes
! %
! +/-
! Seats
! +/-
|-
| bgcolor=| 
| align=left| Social Democratic Party (SPD)
| 93,546
| 29.5
|  3.5
| 16
|  2
|-
| bgcolor=| 
| align=left| Alliance 90/The Greens (Grüne)
| 71,880
| 22.7
|  10.6
| 12
|  5
|-
| bgcolor=| 
| align=left| Christian Democratic Union (CDU)
| 69,670
| 22.0
|  4.2
| 12
|  2
|-
| bgcolor=| 
| align=left| Free Democratic Party (FDP)
| 18,704
| 5.9
|  1.4
| 3
|  1
|-
| 
| align=left| Citizens' Initiative Braunschweig
| 16,778
| 5.3
|  0.7
| 3
| ±0
|-
| bgcolor=| 
| align=left| Alternative for Germany (AfD)
| 13,512
| 4.3
|  4.6
| 2
|  3
|-
| bgcolor=| 
| align=left| The Left (Die Linke)
| 12,428
| 3.9
|  0.7
| 2
|  1
|-
|-
| bgcolor=| 
| align=left| Volt Germany (Volt)
| 6,467
| 2.0
| New
| 1
| New
|-
| bgcolor=| 
| align=left| Die PARTEI (PARTEI)
| 6,302
| 2.0
|  0.5
| 1
| ±0
|-
| bgcolor=| 
| align=left| Pirate Party (Piraten)
| 3,261
| 1.0
|  1.4
| 1
| ±0
|-
| bgcolor=| 
| align=left| Grassroots Democratic Party (dieBasis)
| 2,999
| 0.9
| New
| 1
| New
|-
| colspan=7 bgcolor=lightgrey| 
|-
| bgoclor=| 
| align=left| Alliance for Innovation and Justice (BIG)
| 1,646
| 0.5
| New
| 0
| New
|-
! colspan=2| Total
! 317,193
! 100.0
! 
! 
! 
|-
! colspan=2| Valid votes
! 107,850
! 98.5
! 
! 
! 
|-
! colspan=2| Invalid votes
! 1,606
! 1.5
! 
! 
! 
|-
! colspan=2| Total
! 109,456
! 100.0
! 
! 54
! ±0
|-
! colspan=2| Electorate/voter turnout
! 197,728
! 55.4
!  0.2
! 
! 
|-
| colspan=7| Source: City of Braunschweig
|}

Twin towns – sister cities

Braunschweig is twinned with:

 Bandung, Indonesia (1960)
 Nîmes, France (1962)
 Bath, England (1971)
 Sousse, Tunisia (1980)
 Kiryat Tiv'on, Israel (1985)
 Magdeburg, Germany (1987)
 Kazan, Russia (1988)
 Omaha, United States (1992)
 Zhuhai, China (2011)

Transport

Braunschweig's city centre is mostly a car-free pedestrian zone.

Road
Two main autobahns serve Braunschweig, the A2 (Berlin—Hanover—Dortmund) and the A39 (Salzgitter—Wolfsburg). City roads are generally wide, built after World War II to support the anticipated use of the car. There are several car parks in the city.

Bicycle
Many residents travel around town by bicycle using an extensive system of bicycle-only lanes. The main train station includes a bicycle parking area.

Train
The city is on the main rail line between Frankfurt and Berlin. Deutsche Bahn (German Railways) serves the city with local, inter-city and high-speed InterCityExpress (ICE) trains, with frequent stops at Braunschweig Central Station (German: Braunschweig Hauptbahnhof).

Tram and bus

First opened in 1897, it has been modernized, including a  extension in 2007. The network has an  gauge, unique for a European railway or tramway network. However, it is being supplemented in stages by a third rail, to allow future joint working with the  main railway network.

The municipally owned Braunschweiger Verkehrs-AG currently operates five tram lines and several bus lines. The tram lines are:

Air

Name

Many other geographical locations around the world are named Brunswick, after the historical English name of Braunschweig. Between 1714 and 1837, the House of Hanover ruled Great Britain in personal union with the Electorate of Hanover. The House of Hanover was formally known as the House of Brunswick-Lüneburg, Hanover line. As a result, many places in the British colonies were named after Brunswick, such as the province of New Brunswick in Canada.

Ironically, the city of Braunschweig was not ruled by the Hanoverians while its name was being given to other Brunswicks around the world. Starting in 1269, the Duchy of Brunswick-Lüneburg underwent a series of divisions and mergers, with parts of the territory being transferred between various branches of the family. The city of Braunschweig went to the senior branch of the house, the Wolfenbüttel line, while Lüneburg eventually ended up with the Hanover line. Although the territory had been split, all branches of the family continued to style themselves as the House of Brunswick-Lüneburg. In 1884, the senior branch of the House of Welf became extinct. The Hanover line, being the last surviving line of the family, subsequently held the throne of the Duchy of Brunswick from November 1913 until November 1918.

Government offices
The offices of the Luftfahrt-Bundesamt (LBA, "Federal Aviation Office") and the German Federal Bureau of Aircraft Accident Investigation (BFU) are located in Braunschweig.

Research and science

Braunschweig has been an important industrial area.
Today it is known for its University and research institutes, mainly the Johann Heinrich von Thuenen Institute, the Julius Kühn-Institut, and the Institute for Animal Food of the Friedrich Loeffler Institute, until the end of 2007 all part of the Federal Agricultural Research Centre, the German Collection of Microorganisms and Cell Cultures, and the Physikalisch-Technische Bundesanstalt (PTB). The PTB Braunschweig maintains the atomic clock responsible for the DCF77 time signal and the official German time. In 2006 the region of Braunschweig was the most R&D-intensive area in the whole European Economic Area investing 7.1% of its GDP for research & technology. In 2014, the figure had risen to 7.7%, making Braunschweig retain its ranking as the most R&D-intensive region in Germany. Braunschweig was named Germany's City of Science 2007.

Braunschweig University of Technology (German: Technische Universität Braunschweig) was founded in 1745 and is the oldest member of TU9, an incorporated society of the nine most prestigious, oldest, and largest universities focusing on engineering and technology in Germany. With approximately 18,000 students, Braunschweig University of Technology is the third largest university in Lower Saxony.

Education
It had such famous pupils as Carl Friedrich Gauss, Hoffmann von Fallersleben, Richard Dedekind and Louis Spohr. Since 2004, Braunschweig also has an International School.

Lower Saxony's only university of art, founded in 1963, can be found in Braunschweig, the Hochschule für Bildende Künste Braunschweig (Braunschweig College of Fine Arts). The HBK is an institution of higher artistic and scientific education and offers the opportunity to study for interdisciplinary artistic and scientific qualifications. Additionally, one of the campuses of the Eastphalia University of Applied Sciences (German: Ostfalia Hochschule für angewandte Wissenschaften, formerly Fachhochschule Braunschweig/Wolfenbüttel) was located in the city until 2010.

Economy
In 2015, the German weekly business news magazine Wirtschaftswoche ranked Braunschweig as one of the most dynamic economic spaces in all of Germany.

Braunschweig was one of the centres of the industrialization in Northern Germany. During the 19th and early 20th century the canning and railroad industries and the sugar production were of great importance for Braunschweig's economy, but eventually other branches such as the automotive industry became more important, while especially the canning industry began to vanish from the city after the end of World War II. The defunct truck and bus manufacturer Büssing was headquartered in Braunschweig. Current factories in the city include Volkswagen, Siemens, Bombardier Transportation, and Bosch.

The fashion label NewYorker, the publishing house Westermann Verlag, Nordzucker, Volkswagen Financial Services and Volkswagen Bank have their headquarters in the city as well as the Volkswagen utility vehicle holding. Also two major optical companies were headquartered in Braunschweig: Voigtländer and Rollei.

During the 1980s and early 1990s the computer companies Atari and Commodore International both had branches for development and production within the city.

Braunschweig is the home of two piano companies, both known worldwide for the high quality of their instruments: Schimmel and Grotrian-Steinweg. Both companies were founded in the 19th century. Additionally Sandberg Guitars is based in Braunschweig.

Culture

Braunschweig is famous for Till Eulenspiegel, a medieval jester who played many practical jokes on its citizens.
It also had many breweries, and still a very peculiar kind of beer is made called Mumme, first quoted in 1390, a malt-extract that was shipped all over the world.

Braunschweiger Mettwurst, a soft, spreadable smoked pork sausage, is named after the city. Other traditional local dishes include white asparagus, Braunschweiger Lebkuchen, Braunkohl (a variant of kale served with Bregenwurst), and Uhlen un Apen (Low German for "Owls and Guenons", a pastry).

Media
Braunschweig's major local newspaper is the Braunschweiger Zeitung, first published in 1946. Papers formerly published in Braunschweig include the Braunschweigische Anzeigen/Braunschweigische Staatszeitung (1745–1934), the Braunschweigische Landeszeitung (1880–1936) and the Braunschweiger Stadtanzeiger/Braunschweiger Allgemeiner Anzeiger (1886–1941), and the social-democratic  (1871–1933).

Near Braunschweig at Cremlingen-Abbenrode, there is a large medium wave transmitter, which transmits the program of Deutschlandfunk on 756 kHz, the Cremlingen transmitter.

Festivals
Schoduvel, a medieval Northern German form of carnival was celebrated in Braunschweig as early as the 13th century. Since 1979 an annual Rosenmontag parade is held in Braunschweig, the largest in Northern Germany, which is named Schoduvel in honour of the medieval custom.

An annual Weihnachtsmarkt (Christmas market) is held in late November and December on the Burgplatz in the centre of Braunschweig. In 2008 the market had 900,000 visitors.

Museums and galleries

The city's most important museum is the Herzog Anton Ulrich Museum, a well known art museum and the oldest public museum in Germany, founded in 1754. It houses a collection of masters of Western art, including Dürer, Giorgione, Cranach, Holbein, Van Dyck, Vermeer, Rubens, and Rembrandt.

The State Museum of Brunswick (Braunschweigisches Landesmuseum), founded in 1891, houses a permanent collection documenting the history of the Brunswick area ranging from its early history to the present.

The Municipal Museum of Brunswick (Städtisches Museum Braunschweig), founded in 1861, is a museum for art and cultural history, documenting the history of the city of Braunschweig.

The State Natural History Museum is a zoology museum founded in 1754.

Other museums in the city include the Museum of Photography (Museum für Photographie), the Jewish Museum (Jüdisches Museum), the Museum for Agricultural Technology Gut Steinhof, and the Gerstäcker-Museum. Frequent exhibitions of contemporary art are also held by the Art Society of Braunschweig (German: Kunstverein Braunschweig), housed in the Villa Salve Hospes, a classicist villa built between 1805 and 1808.

Music and dance
The Braunschweig Classix Festival was an annual classical music festival. It is the largest promoter of classical music in the region and one of the most prominent music festivals in Lower Saxony.

From 2001 to 2009, and again since 2013, the annual finals of the international breakdance competition Battle of the Year have been held at the Volkswagen Halle in Braunschweig.

Braunschweiger TSC is among the leading competitive formation dance teams in the world and has won multiple World and European championship titles.

Sports

Braunschweig's major local football team is Eintracht Braunschweig. Founded in 1895, Eintracht Braunschweig can look back on a long and chequered history. Eintracht Braunschweig won the German football championship in 1967, and currently plays in the 2. Bundesliga, the second tier of German football, and attracts a large number of supporters. Braunschweig was also arguably the city in which the first ever game of football in Germany took place. The game had been brought to Germany by the local school teacher Konrad Koch, also the first to write down a German version of the rules of football, who organized the first match between pupils from his school Martino-Katharineum in 1874. The 2011 German drama film Lessons of a Dream is based on Koch.

Eintracht Braunschweig also fields a successful women's field hockey team that claimed nine national championship titles between 1965 and 1978. In the past, the club also had first or second-tier teams in the sports of ice hockey, field handball, and water polo.

The New Yorker Lions (formerly Braunschweig Lions) are the city's American football team, winning a record number of 12 German Bowl titles, as well as five Eurobowls (a shared record).

The city's professional basketball team, the Basketball Löwen Braunschweig, plays in the Basketball Bundesliga, the highest level in Germany. The Löwen's predecessor SG Braunschweig had previously played in the Bundesliga as well.

In handball, MTV Braunschweig, the city's oldest sports club (founded in 1847), plays in the semi-professional 3. Liga.

Annual sporting events held in Braunschweig include the international equestrian tournament Löwen Classics, Rund um den Elm, Germany's oldest road bicycle race, and the professional tennis tournament Sparkassen Open.

Notable people

Alphabetical list of some notable people associated with Braunschweig:

See also

Hannover–Braunschweig–Göttingen–Wolfsburg Metropolitan Region

Notes

References

Bibliography

Richard Andree: Braunschweiger Volkskunde. 2nd edition. Vieweg, Braunschweig 1901.
Reinhard Bein, Ernst-August Roloff (eds.): Der Löwe unterm Hakenkreuz. Reiseführer durch Braunschweig und Umgebung 1930–1945. MatrixMedia Verlag, Göttingen 2010, .
Luitgard Camerer, Manfred Garzmann, Wolf-Dieter Schuegraf (eds.): Braunschweiger Stadtlexikon. Joh. Heinr. Meyer Verlag, Braunschweig 1992, .
Oskar Doering: Braunschweig. E. A. Seemann, Leipzig 1905.
Hermann Dürre: Geschichte der Stadt Braunschweig im Mittelalter. Grüneberg, Braunschweig 1861.
Reinhard Dorn: Mittelalterliche Kirchen in Braunschweig. Niemeyer, Hameln 1978, .
F. Fuhse (ed.): Vaterländische Geschichten und Denkwürdigkeiten der Lande Braunschweig und Hannover, Band 1: Braunschweig. 3rd edition. Appelhans Verlag, Braunschweig 1925.
Manfred Garzmann, Wolf-Dieter Schuegraf (eds.): Braunschweiger Stadtlexikon. Ergänzungsband. Joh. Heinr. Meyer Verlag, Braunschweig 1996, .
Otto Hohnstein: Braunschweig am Ende des Mittelalters. Ramdohr, Braunschweig 1886.
Horst-Rüdiger Jarck, Gerhard Schildt (eds.): Die Braunschweigische Landesgeschichte. Jahrtausendrückblick einer Region. 2nd edition. Appelhans Verlag, Braunschweig 2001, .
Horst-Rüdiger Jarck, Dieter Lent et al. (eds.): Braunschweigisches Biographisches Lexikon – 8. bis 18. Jahrhundert. Appelhans Verlag, Braunschweig 2006, .
Horst-Rüdiger Jarck, Günter Scheel (eds.): Braunschweigisches Biographisches Lexikon – 19. und 20. Jahrhundert. Hahnsche Buchhandlung, Hannover 1996, .
Jörg Leuschner, Karl Heinrich Kaufhold, Claudia Märtl (eds.): Die Wirtschafts- und Sozialgeschichte des Braunschweigischen Landes vom Mittelalter bis zur Gegenwart. 3 vols. Georg Olms Verlag, Hildesheim 2008, .
Richard Moderhack (ed.): Braunschweigische Landesgeschichte im Überblick. 3rd edition, Braunschweigischer Geschichtsverein, Braunschweig 1979.
Richard Moderhack: Braunschweiger Stadtgeschichte. Wagner, Braunschweig 1997, .
E. Oppermann: Landeskunde des Herzogtums Braunschweig. Geschichte und Geographie. E. Appelhans, Braunschweig 1911.
Rudolf Prescher: Der Rote Hahn über Braunschweig. Waisenhaus-Buchdruckerei und Verlag, Braunschweig 1955.
Birte Rogacki-Thiemann: Braunschweig. Eine kleine Stadtgeschichte. Sutton Verlag, Erfurt 2005, .
Ernst-August Roloff: Braunschweig und der Staat von Weimar. Waisenhaus-Buchdruckerei und Verlag, Braunschweig 1964.
Ernst-August Roloff: Wie braun war Braunschweig? Hitler und der Freistaat Braunschweig. Braunschweiger Zeitung, Braunschweig 2003.
Gerd Spies (ed.): Braunschweig – Das Bild der Stadt in 900 Jahren. Geschichte und Ansichten. 2 vols., Städtisches Museum Braunschweig, Braunschweig 1985.
Gerd Spies (ed.): Brunswiek 1031 – Braunschweig 1981. Die Stadt Heinrichs des Löwen von den Anfängen bis zur Gegenwart. 2 vols., Städtisches Museum Braunschweig, Braunschweig 1982.
Werner Spieß: Geschichte der Stadt Braunschweig im Nachmittelalter. Vom Ausgang des Mittelalters bis zum Ende der Stadtfreiheit 1491–1671. 2 vols., Waisenhaus-Buchdruckerei und Verlag, Braunschweig 1966, .
Henning Steinführer, Gerd Biegel (eds.): 1913 – Braunschweig zwischen Monarchie und Moderne. Appelhans Verlag, Braunschweig 2015, .

External links

Official website  
Braunschweig – 360° Panoramas
Daily newspaper Braunschweiger Zeitung

 
Capitals of former nations
Duchy of Brunswick
Members of the Hanseatic League